The Girl is a 1987 British-Swedish drama film directed by Arne Mattsson and starring Franco Nero, Bernice Stegers and Christopher Lee.

Plot
A middle-aged man becomes involved with a much younger girl, leading to a scandal.

Cast
 Franco Nero ...  Johan (John) Berg
 Bernice Stegers ...  Eva Berg
 Clare Powney ...  Pat
 Frank Brennan ...  Lindberg
 Christopher Lee ...  Peter Storm
 Mark Robinson ...  Hans
 Derek Benfield ...  Janitor
 Clifford Rose ...  General Carlsson
 Rosie Jauckens ...  Fru Carlsson
 Lenore Zann ...  Viveka
 Heinz Hopf ...  David
 Mark Dowling ...  Silenski
 Pontus Platin ...  Sandberg
 Olle Björling ...  The Host
 Hanna Brogren ...  The Housekeeper

References

External links

1987 films
Swedish thriller drama films
1987 drama films
English-language Swedish films
Films directed by Arne Mattsson
British thriller drama films
1980s English-language films
1980s British films
1980s Swedish films